An Aerial Joy Ride is a 1917 Fox silent comedy, starring Josef Swickard, Annette DeFoe and Raymond Griffith, written and directed by Charles Reed.

Cast
 Josef Swickard - Inventor
 Annette DeFoe - Daughter
 George Utell - Boyfriend (as George Uttal)
 Jack Abbott - Government official
 Harry Moody - Clever crook
 Raymond Griffith - Foolish Crook

References

External links

1917 films
American black-and-white films
American silent short films
American aviation films
1917 comedy films
Silent American comedy films
1917 short films
American comedy short films
1910s American films
1910s English-language films